Gharinda Union is a union of Tangail Sadar Upazila, Tangail District, Bangladesh.

Demographics
According to the 2011 Bangladesh census, Gharinda Union had 7,496 households and a population of 31,817.

The literacy rate (age 7 and over) was 45.1% (Male-48.4%, Female-42.1%).

Transport

The railway station serving Tangail city is situated beside Gharinda Bazar in this union.

See also
 Union Councils of Tangail District

References

Populated places in Dhaka Division
Populated places in Tangail District
Unions of Tangail Sadar Upazila